{{National football team
| Name               = Afghanistan افغانستان
| Badge              = 
| Badge_size         = 150px
| FIFA Trigramme     = AFG
| Nickname           =Lions of Khurasan(شیران خراسان) 
| BSWW Rank          = 
| Association        = Afghanistan Football Federation 
| Confederation      = AFC
| Coach              =  Rohullah Rastagar
| Asst Manager       = Ali Jubair Lali
| Captain            = Zainuddin Sharifi
| Vice Captain       = 
| Most caps          = Samiullah Mohammadi (13)
| Top scorer         = Samiullah Mohammadi (15)
| Home Stadium       = Ghazi Stadium (25,000)
| pattern_la1        = _AFG14h
| pattern_b1         = _AFG14h|pattern_ra1=_AFG14h|pattern_sh1=_AFG14h|pattern_so1=
| leftarm1           = DD0000
| body1              = DD0000 |rightarm1=DD0000 |shorts1=FF0000 |socks1=none
| pattern_la2        = _AFG14a
| pattern_b2         = _AFG14a|pattern_ra2=_AFG14a|pattern_sh2= _AFG14a|pattern_so2=leftarm2=FFFFFF
| body2              = FFFFFF|rightarm2=FFFFFF|shorts2=000000|socks2=none|
|
| First game         =  4–6 (Haiyang; 16 June 2012) 
| Largest loss       =  0–11 (Danang; 25 September 2016)
| Largest win        =  9–4 (Danang; 29 September 2016)
| Regional name      = World Cup
| Regional cup apps     = 0                                                                                                                                                                          
| Regional cup first    = – 
| Regional cup best     =  Became 4th at the AFC Beach Soccer Championship
| 2ndRegional name      = AFC Beach Soccer Championship
| 2ndRegional cup apps  = 2
| 2ndRegional cup first = 2013
| 2ndRegional cup best  = ''Became 4th at the AFC Beach Soccer Championship (2016)
}}

The Afghanistan national beach soccer team (Dari: تیم ملی فوتبال ساحلی افغانستان) represents Afghanistan in international beach soccer competitions and is controlled by the AFF, the governing body for football in Afghanistan.

Current squad
Correct as of March 2017Coach:'''  Rohullah Rastagar

Fixtures & Results

Tournament records

FIFA Beach Soccer World Cup
 1995 – Did not enter
 1996 – Did not enter
 1997 – Did not enter
 1998 – Did not enter
 1999 – Did not enter
 2000 – Did not enter
 2001 – Did not enter
 2002 – Did not enter
 2003 – Did not enter
 2004 – Did not enter
 2005 – Did not enter
 2006 – Did not enter
 2007 – Did not enter
 2008 – Did not enter
 2009 – Did not enter
 2011 – Did not enter
 2013 – Did not qualify
 2015 – Did not enter
 2017 – Did not qualify

AFC Beach Soccer Championship
 2006 – Did not enter
 2007 – Did not enter
 2008 – Did not enter
 2009 – Did not enter
 2011 – Did not enter
 2013 – Groupstage
 2015 – Last 16
 2017 – Groupstage

Asian Beach Games
  2008 – Did not enter
  2010 – Did not enter 
  2012 – Groupstage
  2014 – Did not enter
  2016 – 4th place

References

External links
 Afghanistan Football Federation 

Afghanistan
National sports teams of Afghanistan